Engadine railway station is located on the Illawarra line, serving the Sydney suburb of Engadine. It is served by Sydney Trains T4 line services and limited NSW TrainLink South Coast line services.

History
Engadine station opened on 1 October 1920.

The station was extensively upgraded in 2002 with the provision of extended shelters and passenger lifts between the platforms and the overhead footbridge.

Platforms & services

Transport links
Maianbar Bundeena Bus Service operates one route to and from Engadine station:
989: Wednesday 1 trip only to Bundeena via Maianbar

Premier Motor Service operates one route via Engadine station:
700 Sydney to Eden

Transdev NSW operates four routes via Engadine station:
991: Sutherland station to Heathcote
992: to Kingswood Road
993: Westfield Miranda to Woronora Heights
996: to Heathcote East

References

External links

Engadine station details Transport for New South Wales

Easy Access railway stations in Sydney
Railway stations in Sydney
Railway stations in Australia opened in 1920
Illawarra railway line
Sutherland Shire